Belén is the Spanish name for Bethlehem.
Belen, Belén or Beleń may also refer to:

Places

Argentina 
Belén, Catamarca
Belén de Escobar, Buenos Aires Province

Bolivia 
Belén (Aroma), La Paz Department, Bolivia
Belén (Potosí), Bolivia

Colombia 
Belén, Boyacá
Belén, Nariño
Belén de Andaquies, Caquetá
Belén de Bajirá, Antioquia
Belén de Umbría, Risaralda
Belén, Medellín, Antioquia.

Peru 
 Belén District, Maynas
 Belén District, Sucre

Turkey 
Belen, Çanakkale
Belen, Ezine
Belen, Hani
Belen, Hatay, a town and district of Hatay Province
Belen, Kumluca, Antalya Province
Belen, Kıbrıscık, Bolu Province
Belen, Tarsus, Mersin Province
Belen Pass

United States 
Belen, Mississippi
Belen, New Mexico
Belen (Rail Runner station)

Elsewhere
Belén, Chile
Belén (canton), Heredia, Costa Rica
Belén, Honduras
Belén, Rivas, Nicaragua
Belén River, Panama
Belén, Paraguay
Beleń, Poland
Belén, Uruguay

People

Given feminine name
Belén Arjona (born 1981), Spanish singer
Belén Asensio (born 1976), Spanish taekwondo practitioner
Belén Esteban (born 1973), Spanish television personality
Belén Estévez (born 1981), Argentine dancer and vedette
Belén Fabra (born 1977), Spanish actress
Belén Gache (born 1960), Spanish-Argentinian writer
Belén Gopegui (born 1963), Spanish writer
Belén López (disambiguation)
Belén Rodríguez (born 1984), Argentine showgirl, model, and actress
Belén Rueda (born 1965), Spanish actress
Belén Sánchez (born 1972), Spanish sprint canoer
Belén Scalella (born 1982), Argentine actress and singer
Belén Succi (born 1985), Argentine field hockey player

Surname
Ana Belén (born 1951), Spanish singer
Marta Belen (1942–2005), American opera singer

Education 

Belen High School (Belen, New Mexico)
Belen Jesuit Preparatory School, Miami, Florida
Instituto Técnico Militar, formerly Colegio de Belén, Havana, Cuba

Other uses
Belén, a traditional nativity scene common in the Philippines during the Christmas season
Belén Fraga, a fictional character in the Argentine telenovela Chiquititas
Belen point, a type of projectile point
A.D. Belén, a Costa Rican football club

See also 
 Belem (disambiguation)
 Bilen (disambiguation)